Seyed Mehdi Hosseini Bami (born July 10, 1979; Persian: سید مهدی حسینی بمی) is a Persian composer of contemporary classical music.

Biography
Hosseini was born in Tehran, Iran, and received his master's degree and Doctor of Music degree (DMA) in Composition from Saint Petersburg State Conservatory, named after N. A. Rimsky-Korsakov. 
His major teachers include   Farhad Fakhreddini, Prof. Alexander Minatsakanian, Prof. Nigel Osborne and Prof. Sergei Slonimsky in composition, and Professor Tatiana Bershadskaya in Musicology.
His early musical experiences included from 1998–2001, where he studying music theory, Persian music and composition with Farhad Fakhreddini  in Tehran. Hosseini then entered the Saint Petersburg State Conservatory in 2001 where he under the guidance of Prof. Tatiana Bershadskaya studied musicology and composition with Prof. Mnatsakanian and continued postgraduate course with the composer Sergei Slonimsky. Mehdi Hosseini completed a composition course from the University of Music and Performing Arts, Vienna in 2007 during the summer courses at Mürzzuschlag, Austria where he studied with Nigel Osborne.

Hosseini’s compositions  include works for large orchestra, chamber orchestra, and various ensembles and has been performed and recorded by orchestras and ensembles such as the St. Petersburg State Philharmonic Symphony Orchestra, the Saint Petersburg Academic Symphony Orchestra, Symphony Orchestra of the Opera and Ballet Theatre of the St. Petersburg State Conservatory, North-Ossetian State Symphony Orchestra, Ensemble intercontemporain, Namascae, Lemanic Modern Ensemble, PluralEnsemble, Ensemble Proton Bern, Studio for New Music Ensemble, Moscow Contemporary Music Ensemble, GAMEnsemble and more. His works have been published by the Compozitor Publishing House (Russia), and Donemus (Netherlands).

In the last few years, He was the focus of attention in Russia as a composer. and his works are performed during such festivals as St. Petersburg Musical Spring, Contemporary East and West, Contemporary Past, A Reverse Perspective, Trajectories of Petersburg Avant-Garde, Sound Ways, Moscow Autumn, Moscow Actual Music Festival “Another Space” and others. His music is played in Mariinsky Theatre, Saint Petersburg and Moscow Conservatories, Saint Petersburg and Moscow Philharmonics.

Mehdi Hosseini made an invaluable contribution to the development of the St. Petersburg cultural scene  in 2011  when he opened the Saint Petersburg Contemporary Music Center “reMusik.org” and in 2013, he founded the St. Petersburg International New Music Festival.

Compositions 
 Symphony of Monody (2005);
 Concerto for String Quartet and Chamber Orchestra (2008)
 The Baluch (2009), for alto flute, contrabassoon, horn, xylophone, violin and cello
 Peshtpa (2009), for oboe, Bass clarinet and violoncello
 Taleshi Hava (2010), for solo violin and bassoon
 An Unfinished Draft (2010), for flute, clarinet, piano, violin, violoncello and baritone
 Pause (2010), for flute, clarinet, piano, violin, violoncello and tubular bells
 Monodies (2011), for flute, clarinet, piano, violin and violoncello
 Hesar (2013), for symphony orchestra
 Abkenari (2013), for flute, clarinet, violin and cello
 Sarbang (2014), for flute, oboe, clarinet (Bb), trombone, piano, percussions, violin, viola and cello
 Marsiehâ-ye Khâk (2014), for Symphony Orchestra
 Inertia (2014), for clarinet/bass clarinet, piano, violin and cello
 Sârukhâni (2016), for ensemble

Awards
 Best Classical Album of the Year (2013), From Iranian House of Music

Footnotes

References
 The Moscow Times
 The Tehran Times
 The Saint-Petersburg Times
 Payvand News

External links
 Mehdi Hosseini official site (monodies.com)
 Interview with Mehdi Hosseini, The St.Petersburg Times August 15, 2012 (Issue # 1722).
 Interview with Mehdi Hosseini, Epoch Times - New York 2009
 Interview with Mehdi Hosseini, ON – Neue Musik Köln, February 2021
 Compozitor Publishing House - Russia
 Donemus Publishing - Netherlands

See also
:Category:Compositions by Mehdi Hosseini
Music of Iran
Persian symphonic music

1979 births
Iranian classical composers
Living people
Persian classical musicians